Mahesh Bhupathi and Rohan Bopanna were the defending champions, but Bhupathi decided not to participate.  Bopanna played alongside Édouard Roger-Vasselin.

Bob Bryan and Mike Bryan won the title for a third time, defeating Alexander Peya and Bruno Soares in the final, 6–3, 6–3.

Seeds

Draw

Finals

Top half

Bottom half

References
 Main Draw

BNP Paribas Masters - Doubles
2013 Doubles